Union Sportive Métropolitaine des Transports or simply Métro is a French basketball club that has seen the elite league in France the period from 1930 to 1940. The club founded in 1928, was based in Paris, and also was a section of sports club of the Metropolitan Sports Transport Union. The team has since disappeared and no longer changes at the local level or corporate events.

The women's section has significantly experienced the same history and the same fate.

History 
Métro participated in the first edition of the new National Division championship of France in 1949-1950 and is relegated to Division Excellence. The club return to the great division for the 1965-1966 season.

Honours 

French League
 Winners (2): 1938-39, 1941–42
French League 2
 Winners (2): 1934-35, 1952–53

Notable players 
  Paul Hotille
  Étienne Roland
  André Tartary

Head coaches 
  Henri Hell
  André Tartary

References

External links 
 Official site

Basketball teams in Paris
Basketball teams established in 1928
1928 establishments in France